Chuspiccocha (Quechua ch'uspi insect, generic name of flies or two-winged insects; fly, qucha lake, lagoon, "fly lake" or "insect lake") is a mountain at a lake of that name in the Raura mountain range in the Andes of Peru, about . It is located in the Huánuco Region, Lauricocha Province, Cauri District.

References

Mountains of Peru
Mountains of Huánuco Region
Glaciers of Peru
Lakes of Peru
Lakes of Huánuco Region